Ranokhetro ( Battleground) is a 1998 Bengali language Indian crime thriller film directed by Haranath Chakraborty and produced by Shrikant Mohta and Mahendra Soni under the banner of  Shree Venkatesh Films. The film features actors Prosenjit Chatterjee and Satabdi Roy in the lead roles. Music of the film has been composed by Debojyoti Mishra

Plot 
Santu is murdered in the hands of a corrupt minister's drug-peddling son when he protests against the sale of drugs on the college campus. As the law enforcers turn a deaf ear to Raja's pleas, he decides to avenge his brother's death.

Cast
 Prosenjit Chatterjee as Raja Roy Chowdhury
 Satabdi Roy as Jhuma Bose, news reporter of Dainik Janabaani
 Ranjit Mallick as Sudeb Mitra, college principal/Pritam Singh
 Deepankar De as MLA Satya Roy
 Tota Roy Chowdhury as Noni Roy, MLA's son
 Dulal Lahiri as corrupt inspector Jeevan Dutta
 Subhendu Chatterjee as Ashok Bose, Editor of Dainik Janabaani, Jhuma's father
 Kushal Chakraborty as Santosh Roy Chowdhury, alias Santu, Raja's younger brother
 Aparajita Auddy as Rita, Santu's love interest
 Kaushik Banerjee as Mintu
 Lily Chakraborty as Raja and Santu's Mother
 Subhasish Mukhopadhyay as Ajay alias Felu
 Tarun Kumar
 Raju Thakkar as drug dealer Jung Bahadur

Awards
Anandalok Award for Best Actor Prosenjit Chatterjee

References

Bengali-language Indian films
1998 films
1990s Bengali-language films
Indian action drama films
Indian action thriller films
1990s action drama films
1998 action thriller films
Films directed by Haranath Chakraborty